Superhero Brother (2008) is the eighth studio album released by American trio G. Love and Special Sauce.

Track listing
 "Communication" (3:21)
 "City Livin'" (4:05)
 "Wiggle Worm" (4:05)
 "Peace, Love, and Happiness" (3:42)
 "Soft and Sweet" (3:21)
 "Wont'cha Come Home" (2:32)
 "Crumble" (4:47)
 "What We Need" (3:20)
 "Grandmother" (2:42)
 "Georgia Brown" (3:17)
 "Who's Got the Weed" (5:45)
 "Superhero Brother" (4:24)

Personnel
G. Love - vocals, guitar, harmonica on "City Livin'", "Wiggle Worm", "Peace, Love and Happiness", "Soft and Sweet", "Grandmother" and "Superhero Brother", claps on "City Livin'" and "Peace, Love and Happiness", whistle on "Wiggle Worm", backing vocals on "Crumble" and "Who Got the Weed?", beatbox on "What We Need"
Jeffrey Clemens - drums, backing vocals, percussion on "Communication", "Soft and Sweet", "Wontcha Come Home", "What We Need" and "Grandmother", claps on "City Livin'" 
Jimi "Jazz" Prescott - string bass, electric bass on "Communication", "Wiggle Worm", "What We Need" and "Grandmother", claps on "City Livin'"
Mark Boyce - piano, organ on "Peace, Love and Happiness", "Soft and Sweet", "Crumble", "What We Need" and "Grandmother", backing vocals on "Communication", "Wiggle Worm" and "What We Need", Analogue synthesizer on "Wiggle Worm", clavinet on "Who's Got the Weed?", claps on "City Livin'"
Chris DiBeneditto - percussion on "Peace, Love and Happiness", "Wontcha Come Home", "Grandmother" and "Who's Got the Weed?", backing vocals on "Wontcha Come Home" and "Who's Got the Weed?", claps on "City Livin'"
Pete Donelly - backing vocals, percussion, claps on "Peace, Love and Happiness"
Fred Berman - percussion, claps on "Peace, Love And Happiness"
Dela - saxophone on "City Livin'"
Sheffer Bruton - trombone on "City Livin'"
C-Money - trumpet on "City Livin'"
Tre Hardson (Formally of The Pharcyde) - vocals, backing vocals on "Who's Got the Weed?"

References

2008 albums
G. Love & Special Sauce albums